The shrub-ox (Euceratherium collinum) is an extinct genus and species of ovibovine caprine native to North America along with Bootherium (Bootherium bombifrons) and Soergel's ox (Soergelia mayfieldi).

Descriptions
 
 
Euceratherium was one of the first bovids to enter North America. It appeared on the continent during the early Pleistocene, long before the first bison arrived from Eurasia. It became extinct about 11,500 years ago. It was formally described in 1904. It is possibly synonymous with Bootherium, although this is uncertain.

Late Pleistocene shrub-ox remains are known from fossil finds spanning from northern California to central Mexico. In the East they were distributed at least into Illinois.

Euceratherium was massively built and in size between a modern American bison and a musk ox. On the basis of preserved dung pellets, it has been established that they were browsers with a diet of trees and shrubs.
They seem to have preferred hilly landscapes.

References

Further reading
 P. S. Martin: Quaternary Extinctions. The University of Arizona Press, 1984 
 Grundzüge der Faunen- und Verbreitungsgeschichte der Säugetiere, E. Thenius, 2.Auflage, Gustav Fischer Verlag, Stuttgart, 1980

External links 
 Image of Euceratherium

Prehistoric bovids
Pleistocene even-toed ungulates
Pleistocene mammals of North America
Fossil taxa described in 1904
Prehistoric even-toed ungulate genera